Qareh Qayeh (also Romanized as Qarah Qīyah; also known as Garkīyeh, Qareh Qīyah-e Moshk-e ‘Anbar, and Qareh Tappeh) is a village in Sina Rural District, in the Central District of Varzaqan County, East Azerbaijan Province, Iran. At the 2006 census, its population was 54, in 8 families.

References 

Towns and villages in Varzaqan County